Tímár is a Hungarian surname meaning 'currier'. Notable people with the surname include:

 Mátyás Tímár (1923–2020), Hungarian politician and economist
 Péter Tímár (born 1950), Hungarian film director and screenwriter

Hungarian-language surnames